James Leslie Bartram (8 March 1911 – 1987) was an English footballer who played as a centre forward for clubs including Portsmouth, North Shields, Falkirk, Northampton Town and Queen of the South plus a brief spell with Morton during World War II.

His time at Falkirk was prolific in terms of scoring, making good use of his strong physique (which combined with his surname gave rise to a nickname of "Battering-Ram") to claim 67 goals in 73 Scottish Football League and Scottish Cup matches, leading to a transfer to Northampton for a club record fee of £1,000 in June 1935; however, by December of the same year he had been moved on to Queen of the South, where he only played for the Dumfries club in the league until the end of that same season, though remained contracted to them until the outbreak of the war. He went back to North East of England and signed for South Shields in July 1936.

He was the uncle of Sam Bartram, the long-serving goalkeeper for Charlton Athletic.

References

1911 births
1987 deaths
Footballers from South Shields
English footballers
Association football forwards
Portsmouth F.C. players
North Shields F.C. players
Falkirk F.C. players
Northampton Town F.C. players
Queen of the South F.C. players
Greenock Morton F.C. players
English Football League players
Scottish Football League players